Bonyhád is a town in Tolna County in Southwestern Hungary.

Government
It is governed by a city council and a mayor. The current mayor of Bonyhád is Filóné Ferencz Ibolya who has served in this capacity since 2014.

Populations
The town's ethnic composition includes Hungarians, Germans, Székely and Romani and the town has a long history.

In the years leading to World War II, Bonyhád had a sizable Jewish population. In 1941, Jews constituted approximately 14% of the total population. The community was divided between Orthodox and Neolog Judaism traditions. At the time Rabbi Aaron Pressburger and Rabbi Lajos Schwartz were the town's Orthodox and Neologue rabbis. They accompanied their community to Auschwitz where they too were murdered.

There were many in Bonyhád who considered themselves German and were members of the pro-Nazi Volksbund. Perhaps that is why a large Hitler birthday event took place in Bonyhád  with the German ambassador in attendance.

After the occupation of Hungary by the German army in March 1944, the town's remaining Jewish citizens were isolated and their property was confiscated by the Hungarian authorities. In May 1944, the Jewish population was estimated at around 1,300. Between May 12–15, 1944 the Jewish communities of Bonyhád, Bátaszék, Szekszárd and surrounding villages were moved to the two ghettos in Bonyhád. Some Jews were severely tortured to find out where they may have placed valuables. On July 1, 1944 those in the two ghettos were transported by train to the Lakitcs military barracks in the nearby city Pécs and from there deported in horrible conditions to Auschwitz, where most were murdered upon arrival on June 9, 1944 - Tamuz 18, 5704 on the Jewish calendar. Bonyhád was captured and occupied on 30 November 1944 by Soviet troops of the 3rd Ukrainian Front in the course of the Budapest Offensive.

After the war many in the Volksbund were deported and Székely Hungarians were brought to settle from Hungarian regions of Romania.

A few Jewish survivors made an effort to reestablish in Bonyhád the Orthodox and Neologue communities.

After the 1956 revolt most of Bonyhád's Jews escaped to freedom from Hungary and settled mainly to North America and Israel. By 1963 there were only 4 Jewish families left in the town. Bonyhád's last Jewish resident, Ms. Sári (Kaufman) Warum, died in April 2013. She was a survivor of Auschwitz.

Facilities
Bonyhád is home to the Völgység Museum. The town's population is served by a Roman Catholic church and a Lutheran church. The remains of the town's two Synagogues are still visible. There are nine cemeteries, including an Orthodox and the Neologue Jewish cemetery. Various sporting facilities and three high school/college compounds (e.g. Petőfi Sándor Evangélikus Gimnázium, Perczel Mór Szakközépiskola) along with the City Hospital currently serve the residents. Telephone service is provided by Bonicom Kft. Gas service is provided by Futomu Kft and water by Vizmu Reszleg.

Sport
Bonyhád VLC

Twin towns – sister cities

Bonyhád is twinned with:

 Borsec, Romania

 Jastrowie, Poland
 Pančevo, Serbia
 Siculeni, Romania
 Treuchtlingen, Germany
 Tvrdošovce, Slovakia
 Wernau, Germany

References

External links

 
Street map 
Bonyhad Jewish Community

Populated places in Tolna County